Czerwone ciernie is a Polish historical film. It was released in 1976.

Cast 

 Jan Nowicki (Stefan Wojnicz)
 Emilia Krakowska (Mańka)
 Barbara Wrzesińska (Julia)
 Stanisław Jaśkiewicz 
 Władimir Iwaszow (Władimir)
 Mieczysław Hryniewicz (Sułek)
 Maria Klejdysz (Sułkowa)
 Mieczysław Voit (Legart)
 Michał Pawlicki (Sznajder)
 Stanisław Michalski (Leśniewski)
 Henryk Bista (Rosenblatt)
 Jan Padkowski (Kolasa)
 Zygmunt Hobot 
 Piotr Łysak (Kamil)
 Bolesław Płotnicki 
 Henryk Machalica 
 Eugeniusz Wałaszek 
 Andrzej Jurczak 
 Zygmunt Wiaderny 
 Zdzisław Szymborski 
 Irena Burawska

References

1976 films
Polish historical films
1970s Polish-language films
1970s historical films